Ing, ING or ing  may refer to:

Art and media 
 ...ing, a 2003 Korean film
 i.n.g, a Taiwanese girl group
 The Ing, a race of dark creatures in the 2004 video game Metroid Prime 2: Echoes
 "Ing", the first song on The Roches' 1992 album A Dove

In old Germanic history
 Ing, form of the Germanic god name Yngvi 
 Ingwaz rune, also known as Ing in Old English, a runic symbol possibly referring to Yngvi

Go game 
 Ing Cup, an international Go tournament sponsored by the Ing Foundation (founded by Ing Chang-ki)
 Ing Prize, an incentive for research in computer Go
 Ing rules, a ruleset of Go

People 
 Ing (surname), a medieval English surname, of Norse-Viking origins
 Ing Chang-ki (1914–1997), Taiwanese industrialist, philanthropist and founder of the Ing Foundation
 Ing Yoe Tan (born 1948), Dutch lawmaker of Chinese descent, member of the Senate for the Labour Party (PvdA) since 1998

Other uses 
 Ing., abbreviation for the Engineer's degree awarded in many countries by technical universities or polytechnics
 ING, Inactive National Guard of the U.S. Army
 Index Nominum Genericorum, an index of all published generic names of plants covered by the International Code of Botanical Nomenclature
 ING Group, a Dutch financial institution with operations worldwide
 Ing River, a tributary of the Mekong 
 ING Unsung Heroes, a grant program for Kindergarten through 12th grade educators in the United States
 Instituut voor Nederlandse Geschiedenis, Institute of Dutch History
 Isaac Newton Group of Telescopes, in La Palma, Canary Islands

See also
 -ing, an English suffix
 Ings (disambiguation)